Bigelow Apartments is a historic three-story building in Salt Lake City, Utah. It was built in 1930-1931 by Archelaus Fillingame, and designed in the Exotic Revival style. Fillingame was the developer, architect, builder and owner of the building, which remained in the Fillingame family until 1948. It has been listed on the National Register of Historic Places since December 30, 2004.

References

	
National Register of Historic Places in Salt Lake City
Revival architecture in the United States
Residential buildings completed in 1930
1930 establishments in Utah